Wágner Ferreira dos Santos (born 29 January 1985), simply known as Wágner, is a Brazilian footballer who plays as an attacking midfielder for Vila Nova.

Club career
Born in Sete Lagoas, Minas Gerais, Wágner started his career at América Mineiro, where he shone along with Fred, an international Brazilian player, who, coincidentally, is again Wagner's colleague in Fluminense FC. Wágner went on to play for Cruzeiro, another team from Belo Horizonte. Cruzeiro sold Wágner to Al-Ittihad after a transfer fee of around €9 million in January 2007, but a clause in his contract allowed him to come back to Cruzeiro in June 2007 after Al-Ittihad could not finish paying his transfer fee. He was important in Al-Ittihad's championship run. On 7 August 2009 Championat.ru confirmed that Lokomotiv Moscow had acquired the Brazilian player, for 6 million euros. Three days later this move was confirmed by Nikolay Naumov, president of Lokomotiv.

On 17 January 2011 he signed for Gaziantepspor for €3 million.

After a feud with Gaziantepspor manager Abdullah Ercan, Wágner's contract was terminated by a mutual agreement.

International career
He has played for the Brazil U17 and U21 squad.

He was also called up for the Brazil national team for a friendly in 2006, following the World Cup in Germany, by coach Dunga, but never played; the game finished Brazil 1-1 Norway. He was also placed in standby lists for the 2007 Copa América and the 2008 Summer Olympics.

Style of play
Wagner is a left footed offensive midfielder and striker, but is also working on using his right foot. Despite playing all of the 2006 season as an offensive midfielder, he led the Campeonato Brasileiro, in its early stages, with eight goals in ten games. He is a free-kick specialist, scoring a majority of his goals through free-kicks.

Career statistics

Honours

Club
Cruzeiro
 Campeonato Mineiro: 2006, 2008, 2009

Al-Ittihad
 Saudi Premier League: 2006–07

Fluminense
 Campeonato Carioca: 2012
 Campeonato Brasileiro Série A: 2012

Individual
 Bola de Prata: 2006, 2008

References

External links
 
 CBF  

Living people
1985 births
Brazilian footballers
Brazilian expatriate footballers
América Futebol Clube (MG) players
Cruzeiro Esporte Clube players
Ittihad FC players
FC Lokomotiv Moscow players
Gaziantepspor footballers
Fluminense FC players
Tianjin Jinmen Tiger F.C. players
CR Vasco da Gama players
Al-Khor SC players
Saudi Professional League players
Qatar Stars League players
Campeonato Brasileiro Série A players
Russian Premier League players
Süper Lig players
Chinese Super League players
Association football midfielders
Expatriate footballers in Saudi Arabia
Expatriate footballers in Russia
Expatriate footballers in Turkey
Expatriate footballers in China
Expatriate footballers in Qatar
Brazilian expatriate sportspeople in Saudi Arabia
Brazilian expatriate sportspeople in Russia
Brazilian expatriate sportspeople in Turkey
Brazilian expatriate sportspeople in China
Brazilian expatriate sportspeople in Qatar